Peggy Ann Clasen (born 7 April 1969) is a former American female speed skater. She was primarily a sprint speed skater, and competed at the World Sprint speed skating Championships from 1990 to 1993.

Peggy also competed at the 1992 Winter Olympics and 1994 Winter Olympics representing the United States.

References 

1969 births
Living people
American female speed skaters
Olympic speed skaters of the United States
Speed skaters at the 1992 Winter Olympics
Speed skaters at the 1994 Winter Olympics
Speed skaters from Saint Paul, Minnesota
21st-century American women